Shul (also Romanized as Shūl; also known as Shūl-e Pasakūn and Shūl-e Paskūn) is a village in Vahdatiyeh Rural District, Sadabad District, Dashtestan County, Bushehr Province, Iran. At the 2006 census, its population was 378, in 79 families.

References 

Populated places in Dashtestan County